The Western Interstate Conference was a short-lived intercollegiate athletic football conference that existed from 1923 to 1927. The league had members in Illinois and Iowa.

Champions

1923 – Unknown
1924 – Loras
1925 – DePaul (IL)
1926 – DePaul (IL)
1927 – Saint Viator (IL)

See also
List of defunct college football conferences

References

Defunct college sports conferences in the United States
College sports in Illinois
College sports in Iowa